Léo Brière (born 11 January 1994) is a French mentalist and illusionist, known to be winner at the French Magic Championship in 2019. In 2018, he appeared on France Got Talent where he goes to the semifinals.

Personal life
Léo Brière grew up in Sées, in Normandy. Passionate about shows, magic and circus, Léo Brière joined the French circus Pinder in 2012 at the age of 18 and became the youngest loyal man in France by presenting the shows for two years.

At the age of 21, Léo Brière created Cirque Gold, where he did artistic direction and major illusions for six months.

Career
Brière began his mentalist career in 2016 with his first show "Influence" in Paris during 2 years, and then, on tour in France.
In 2018, he is a semi-finalist from TV show France Got Talent season 13, during which he presents magic numbers from his second show "Premonition".
On March 10, 2019, he won the 2019 French Magic Championship, which is broadcast on French TV Paris Première on June 15, 2019.

Stage Shows 
 2016 / 2018 – Influence
 2018 / 2019 – Prémonition 
 2020 - "L'experience interdite"

Awards and nominations 
 2017 - Influence | FFAP's French magic show of the year 2017/2018 : Nominated
 2019 - French Magic Championship 2019 : Won

References 

1994 births
Living people
Mentalists
French magicians